was the second vessel in the two-vessel  of heavy cruisers in the Imperial Japanese Navy. The ship was named after the Kako River in Hyogo prefecture, Japan.

Background
Kako and her sister ship Furutaka were the first generation of high speed heavy cruisers in the Japanese navy, intended to counter the US Navy  scout cruisers and Royal Navy  heavy cruisers.

Service career

Early career
Kako was completed at Kawasaki Shipbuilding Corporation at Kobe on 20 July 1926. Assigned to the Fifth Squadron (Sentai) from then until 1933, she served in Japanese and Chinese waters, participating in fleet maneuvers and combat operations off the China coast. Kako was given a major refit in 1929–30, improving her machinery and slightly changing her appearance. Briefly operating with Cruiser Division 6 in 1933, Kako was in the naval review off Yokohama in late August. She went into guard ship status in November of that year and into reserve in 1934.

In July 1936, Kako began an extensive reconstruction at Sasebo Navy Yard, which was completed by 27 December 1937. At this time, the ship's six single  main gun turrets were replaced by three  twin turrets.

At the time of the attack on Pearl Harbor, she was engaged in support for the invasion of Guam.

After the failed first invasion of Wake Cruiser Division 6 was assigned to the larger second invasion force, and after the fall of Wake, returned to its forward base in Truk, Caroline Islands.

From 18 January 1942, Cruiser Division 6 was assigned to support Japanese troop landings at Rabaul, New Britain and Kavieng, New Ireland and in patrols around the Marshall Islands in unsuccessful pursuit of the American fleet. In March and April 1942, Cruiser Division 6 provided support to Cruiser Division 18 in covering the landings of Japanese troops in the Solomon Islands and New Guinea at Buka, Shortland, Kieta, Manus Island, Admiralty Islands and Tulagi from a forward base at Rabaul. While at Shortland on 6 May 1942, Kako was unsuccessfully attacked by four United States Army Air Forces Boeing B-17 Flying Fortresses, but was not damaged.

Battle of the Coral Sea
At the Battle of the Coral Sea, Cruiser Division 6 departed Shortland and effected a rendezvous at sea with light aircraft carrier .

The following day, 8 May 1942 46 SBD Dautlesses, 21 TBD Devastators and 15 Grumman F4F Wildcats from Yorktown and Lexington damaged the aircraft carrier  severely above the waterline and forced her retirement. As Furutaka and Kinugasa, undamaged in the battle, escorted Shōkaku back to Truk, Kako and Aoba continued to cover the withdrawing Port Moresby invasion convoy.

After refueling at Shortland on 9 May, Kako was stranded on a reef entering Queen Carola Harbor, but was soon re-floated.

Kako returned to Kure Naval Arsenal on 22 May 1942 for repairs, and returned to Truk on 23 June and from Truk to Rekata Bay, Santa Isabel Island, where she was assigned patrols through July.

In a major reorganization of the Japanese navy on 14 July 1942, Kako was assigned to the newly created Eighth Fleet under Vice Admiral Mikawa Gunichi and was assigned to patrols around the Solomon Islands, New Britain and New Ireland.

Battle of Savo Island
On 8 August 1942, north of Guadalcanal a three-seat Aichi E13A1 "Jake" reconnaissance floatplane launched from Kako was shot down by an SBD Dauntless of VS-72 from the aircraft carrier . This was the prelude to the Battle of Savo Island the following day.

At about 2300, Chōkai, Furutaka and Kako all launched their reconnaissance floatplanes. The circling floatplanes dropped flares illuminating the targets and all the Japanese ships opened fire. Kakos gunfire hit Vincennes in the hangar and destroyed all of her Curtiss SOC Seagull floatplanes. On the Japanese side, Chōkai was hit three times, Kinugasa twice, Aoba once; Furutaka and Kako were not damaged.

On 10 August, Cruiser Division 6's four cruisers were ordered unescorted to Kavieng, while the remainder of the striking force returned to Rabaul. At 0708, three torpedoes hit Kako. The first struck to starboard abreast the No. 1 turret. The other torpedoes hit further aft, in the vicinity of the forward magazines and boiler rooms 1 and 2. Kako had all of her portholes open, and within 5 minutes she rolled over on her starboard side and exploded as sea water reached her boilers. Aoba, Furutaka and Kinugasa rescued Captain Takahashi and most of Kakos crew, but thirty-four crewmen were killed.

Kako was removed from the navy list on 15 September 1942.

References

Sources

External links

  
Tabular record:  CombinedFleet.com: Kako history (Retrieved 4 April 2016.)

Furutaka-class cruisers
Ships built by Kawasaki Heavy Industries
1925 ships
World War II cruisers of Japan
Ships sunk by American submarines
Shipwrecks in Ironbottom Sound
Maritime incidents in August 1942